"Strong" is a song by English recording artist Robbie Williams. It was released on 15 March 1999 as the third single from his second studio album, I've Been Expecting You (1998). The song managed to break into the top five in the United Kingdom. The B-side is the live version of "Let Me Entertain You" recorded at the 1999 Brit Awards, the performance was included on the single in the enhanced section.

In June 2017, Williams performed at the One Love Manchester benefit concert, in aid of the Manchester Arena bombing victims and as a display of the city's unity against terrorism. Williams opened and closed his set by leading a 55,000-strong terrace chant of the song's chorus, changing the lyrics to "Manchester we're strong, we're strong, we're strong. And we're still singing our songs, our songs, our songs!".

On the final night of Williams's 2003 Knebworth House concerts, 125,000 ticketholders sang Strong to set the world record for Most Karaoke Participants. Williams and his audience held the record until 2009, when 160,000 people sang Friends in Low Places by Garth Brooks whilst in attendance at the 2009 NASCAR Sharpie 500 race.

Background and release
"Strong" was written by Robbie Williams while he was in a hotel in Cologne, Germany. It was inspired by some of his most hardcore fans, who, Williams confessed, "scared the living daylights out of [him]". He said, "I just wanted them to understand I'm not being rude, but I'm feeling a bit scared of everything."

Following its release on 15 March 1999, "Strong" became Williams' seventh top-five single in the United Kingdom, peaking at number four on the UK Singles Chart. The track also reached the top 10 in New Zealand, debuting and peaking at number nine on 30 May 1999.

Music video
The video is a compilation of on-tour footage, including many live performances, Williams with his nephew, Williams on stage with his dad, and Williams messing about.

Track listings
UK CD single
 "Strong"
 "Let Me Entertain You" (live at the Brit Awards '99)
 "Happy Song"
 "Let Me Entertain You" (live at the Brit Awards '99 video)

UK cassette single
 "Strong"
 "Let Me Entertain You" (live at the Brit Awards '99)
 "Happy Song"

European CD single
 "Strong"
 "Let Me Entertain You" (live at the Brit Awards '99)
 "Let Me Entertain You" (live at the Brit Awards '99 video)

Credits and personnel
Credits are lifted from the I've Been Expecting You album booklet.

Studio
 Mastered at Metropolis Mastering (London, England)

Personnel

 Robbie Williams – writing, vocals
 Guy Chambers – writing, acoustic guitar, electric guitar, keyboards, piano, production, arrangement
 Gary Nuttall – background vocals
 David Catlin-Birch – background vocals, acoustic guitar, bass guitar
 Steve McEwan – background vocals, electric guitar
 Andre Barreau – background vocals 

 Fil Eisler – guitar, guitar solos
 Jeremy Stacey – drums
 Andy Duncan – percussion
 Steve Power – production, recording, mixing, programming
 Steve McNichol – programming
 Tony Cousins – mastering

Charts

Weekly charts

Year-end charts

Certifications

Cover versions
 In 2015, Lower Than Atlantis released a cover of the song on the 2015 reissue of their self-titled album.

References

Robbie Williams songs
1998 songs
1999 singles
Chrysalis Records singles
Song recordings produced by Guy Chambers
Song recordings produced by Steve Power
Songs written by Guy Chambers
Songs written by Robbie Williams